The Jaw is a mountain located in the Teton Range, Grand Teton National Park in the U.S. state of Wyoming. The Jaw is  WNW of Rock of Ages and  WSW of Mount Saint John The summit is at the head of Hanging Canyon.

References

Mountains of Grand Teton National Park
Mountains of Wyoming
Mountains of Teton County, Wyoming